The Manchester Bury & Bolton Reservoir, commonly called Elton Reservoir, is located near the A58 Bolton Road in Greater Manchester, about 3 km (1.8 mi) south west of the town of Bury. Constructed in 1842 at the height of the canal era, it remains today as legacy of the industrial era and a major leisure facility for residents of Bury, Bolton and North Manchester.

Description
The reservoir covers 226,000 sq m (56 acres) and contains some 1 million cubic metres (220 million imperial gallons). It is an important area for both resident and migrating water fowl, attracting many species throughout the year.

History

The reservoir was constructed and opened in 1842 as a feeder for the Manchester Bolton & Bury Canal. The water was used to top up the canal as water was lost at the bottom end of the canal. Initially, water was to have been taken from the River Irwell, however local mill owners objected citing a loss of water for their mills so the reservoir was constructed. Today water is still taken from the Irwell at Burrs Country Park and taken by feeder channel to Elton Reservoir which in turn feeds the remains of the canal.

Leisure use
The reservoir has been used for leisure since the Elton Club was founded in 1858. This club was initially for 'Gentlemen and their sons' to engage in the pursuit of fishing. The club later became the Elton Sailing Club and since 1870, the club has carried out sailing activities. The reservoir is also used for sailing activities by local community groups, Greater Manchester Police 
Sailing & Windsurfing Section and the scouts. The Triathlon clubs of Rochdale and Bolton also use the reservoir for Open Water swimming. The reservoir is now an important fishery in the north west of England managed by Bury Angling Association. The coarse fishery contains many species including, bream, pike, carp, tench and roach.

The National Cycle Route 6 passes alongside the reservoir. There is 6.5 km (4 ml) walking path around the reservoir which is described in the Bury Council book entitled "Walks Around Bury", Copies can be obtained at local libraries and Bury Tourist Information Centre or downloaded from the Bury MBC web site

References

External links
  National Cycle Route 6

Geography of the Metropolitan Borough of Bury
Reservoirs in Greater Manchester
Canal reservoirs in England
Irwell Valley